Bolpress is a press agency based in Bolivia.

External links
Official website

News agencies based in Bolivia